Ken Silverstein is an American business journalist who focuses on global energy issues, climate and environmental issues, and international economics. He is a contributor to Forbes and The Christian Science Monitor.

Biography
Silverstein received a BA and an MBA from Tulane University, and an MA in print journalism from American University. His first job in journalism was working in New York City as an intern for PBS' The McNeil/Lehrer Report in 1983, shortly before it expanded to The McNeil/Lehrer NewsHour.

During the savings and loans crisis in the late 1980s, he covered the insurance and banking industries for American Banker Financial Publications and the Journal of Commerce from Washington, DC. From there, he moved to the energy beat and wrote for Primedia magazines. 
 
In 2002 he became an online energy columnist for IssueAlert, an energy and utilities online column sent to global subscribers and owned by Scientech and UtiliPoint. He is the former editor-in-chief of the online publication, EnergyBiz Insider that is part of Energy Central. His column was subsequently reproduced by news organizations and think tanks that include CommoditiesNow, RealClearEnergy and the  Breakthrough Institute. He is also the former editor-in-chief for Public Utilities Fortnightly,  
Silverstein's work continues to be cited on news sites and referenced in national magazines, newspapers and journals such as The New York Times, The Washington Post, USA Today, EnergyBiz, Atlantic Monthly, Chicago Tribune and the HuffPost. His business reporting and columns about global warming and the environment focus on coal, natural gas, nuclear, wind, and solar energies.

The author's focus is increasingly becoming international with energy, environmental, and trade coverage from China, Japan, Thailand, the Middle East, and Europe.

Enron
Silverstein was part of a team that produced editorial projects for Primedia magazines during the early 2000s. That work focused on regulatory issues in California. As a columnist for IssueAlert, Silverstein focused on ethics, corporate culture, crisis mitigation, and Enron. At the time he placed part of the blame for the Enron crisis on the media. Enron and its impact on corporate conduct is a theme in which Silverstein revisited in Forbes May 2013,  EnergyBiz May 2013, and EnergyBiz July 2013.

Southern California Edison
In 2012 and 2013, Silverstein wrote a series of stories about Southern California Edison's nuclear operations in Southern California. Sources inside the company had told him confidentially that the utility had known of defects with its new steam generators several years before those same issues had caused small radiation leaks in 2012. The company had accused him of journalism malfeasance. But letters surfaced that backed up those claims and the nuclear units were officially retired in June 2013.

Awards and recognition
Media Industry News (MIN) honored Silverstein as one of the "Most Intriguing People in Media."

Silverstein was presented the Gold for Original Web Commentary by the American Society of Business Press Editors in 2012. ASBPE Award

Silverstein's column "Will the Nuclear Sector Rise Again?" for EnergyBiz Insider won the Best Online Column in 2011 presented by Media Industry News. In 2011 he was named a top economic and financial journalist by the nonprofit Wall Street Economists Institute project.

Silverstein's article "Venezuela’s Power Grab" for EnergyBiz Insider was awarded the bronze for Original Web Commentary at the 2008 American Society of Business Publication Editors National Digital Awards. His article "Energizing America" for EnergyBiz Insider received an honorable mention for online column at the 2010 MinOnline Editorial and Design Awards.

References

External links
 Ken Silverstein’s official website: http://www.kensilverstein.com 
 Ken Silverstein on Twitter: https://www.twitter.com/ken_silverstein

American business and financial journalists
American male journalists
Online journalists